La Leocadia (Spanish: Doña Leocadia) or  The Seductress (Spanish: Una Manola) are names given to a mural by the Spanish artist Francisco Goya, completed sometime between 1819–1823, as one of his series of 14 Black Paintings. It shows a woman commonly identified as Goya's maid, companion and (most likely) lover, Leocadia Weiss. She is dressed in a dark, almost funeral maja dress, and leans against what is either a mantelpiece or burial mound, as she looks outward at the viewer with a sorrowful expression. Leocadia is one of the final of the Black Paintings, which he painted in his seventies at a time when he was consumed by political, physical and psychological turmoil, after he fled to the country from his position as court painter in Madrid.

According to the c. 1828–1830 inventory of his friend Antonio Brugada, Leocadia was situated in the ground floor of Quinta del Sordo, Goya's villa which Lawrence Gowing observes was thematically divided: a male side of Saturn Devouring His Son and A Pilgrimage to San Isidro; and a female side compromising Judith and Holofernes, Witches' Sabbath, and Leocadia. All the works in the series were transferred to canvas after Goya's death and are now in the Museo del Prado in Madrid.

Background

In 1819, Goya purchased the Quinta del Sordo ("Villa of the Deaf Man") situated on the banks of the Manzanares near Madrid. This small two-story house was named after a previous occupant who had been deaf, though Goya himself, by coincidence, had been functionally deaf for more than two decades, the result of an illness contracted in 1792. At the age of 73, and having survived two life-threatening illnesses, Goya was concerned with his mortality, and increasingly embittered by the conflicts that engulfed Spain in the decade preceding his move to the Quinta del Sordo, and the developing Spanish Civil War of 1820–1823 and the civil strife — indeed, Goya was completing the plates that formed his series The Disasters of War during this period.

Between 1819 and 1823, before he moved to Bordeaux in 1824, he produced a series of 14 works, which he painted with oils directly onto the walls of his Spanish house. Although he first decorated the rooms of the house with more inspiring images, in time he painted over them with the intense and haunted pictures known today as the Black Paintings — one of which was the portrait of Leocadia. Uncommissioned and never meant for public display, these pictures reflect his darkening mood, with their depictions of intense scenes of malevolence, conflict and despair. If Goya gave titles to the works he produced at the Quinta del Sordo, he never revealed what they were; the names by which they are now known were assigned by others after his death, and the paintings are often identified by variations on the common title. Goya left Spain and Quinta del Sordo in 1824 for exile in France, where he was joined by his housekeeper Leocadia Weiss and her ten-year-old daughter, Rosario, possibly Goya's child.

Description

The painting's funereal air is established through the shading of the gray background, the colouring of the model's black veil and maja dress, and her sad or nostalgic expression. She is positioned before an open blue sky, with her body slightly leaning against a rock or mound. The mound is topped by a row of small wrought iron rails; some critics have suggested it may represent a burial mound. X-ray shows that the mound may originally have been painted as an open fireplace and the veil a later addition. Leocadia's head rests on her forearm as she looks thoughtfully towards the viewer and is portrayed in a sympathetic manner. The work is illuminated by a yellow light falling on her face, arm and chest. The background shows a blue and white sky emitting an ocher yellowish noon-light reminiscent of one of his final works, The Milkmaid of Bordeaux.

The painting contains a sense of peace and air of reconciliation absent in the other works from the series. Writer Juan José Junquera wrote that the work may represent a personification of Melancholy, or given the relationship between artist and model, "the symbol of the fire of love and of the home and the presentiment of coming death". According to Robert Havard, her confident stare and maja dress may be indications of the earlier charge against her of adultery.

Leocadia Weiss

The picture probably depicts Leocadia Weiss (née Zorrilla, 1788–1856) the artist's maid, younger by 35 years, and distant relative, though this identity has been contested. As with any of the paintings from the series, the current title was not Goya's own, and he never mentioned or wrote about any of the Black Paintings. Leocadia was probably similar in features to Goya's first wife Josefa Bayeu, to the extent that one of his well-known portraits bears the cautious title of Josefa Bayeu (or Leocadia Weiss). While Junquera describes the identification of Leocadia as "more romantic ... than a certainty", the work bears strong resemblance to a Goya portrait more or less accepted to be of her, and which was left in her possession following his death.

Leocadia, with her daughter Rosario, lived with and cared for Goya after Bayeu's death. She stayed with him in his Quinta del Sordo villa until 1824. Sometime in 1824 Goya lost faith in, or became threatened by, the restored Spanish monarchy's anti-liberal political and social stance, and abandoned Spain to live in France, until his death 1828. Leocadia followed him with Rosario and stayed until his death.

Not much is known about her beyond that she had a fiery temperament.  It is known that Leocadia had an unhappy marriage with a jeweler, Isidore Weiss, but had been separated from him since 1811, after he had accused her of "illicit conduct". She had two children before that time, and bore a third, Rosario, in 1814 when she was 26. Isidore was not the father, and it has often been speculated – although with little firm evidence – that the child belonged to Goya. There has been much speculation that Goya and Weiss were romantically linked, and that in this work, she is shown as his widow mourning at his tomb. Others believe the affection between them was platonic and sentimental.

From her representations it has been assumed that she was striking looking – if not pretty – and probably in her early 30s at the time of this portrait. She had a strong fiery character; based on Goya's letters, her manner often upset him. Despite the sentiment expressed in a letter in which Goya sent her "a thousand kisses and a thousand things", Leocadia was left nothing in his will.  Mistresses were often omitted in such circumstances. His son Javier, who inherited a large amount of his father's inventory and unsold paintings, but had refused to visit him in Bordeaux, gave her 1,000 francs and pieces of furniture from the home she had shared with his father. 

She wrote to a number of Goya's friends to complain of her exclusion, and that Javier had stolen silverware and pistols from her home. Unfortunately for her, many of her friends were Goya's and by then old men and had died, or died before they could reply. Largely destitute she moved into rented accommodation. In poverty, she passed on her copy of the Caprichos for free. She also sold The Milkmaid of Bordeaux- Goya had told her not to accept less than 'one ounce of gold' - to the Count of Mugurino, but the price she received is lost. Her French pension was cut off shortly after. She possessed a number of Goya's drawings, which she auctioned in 1849; however again it is unknown how much she received for any of them.

Notes

Bibliography

 Buchholz, Elke Linda. Francisco de Goya. Cologne: Könemann, 1999. 
 Connell, Evan S. Francisco Goya: A Life. New York: Counterpoint, 2004. 
 Gassier, Pierre. Goya: A Biographical and Critical Study. New York: Skira, 1955
 Havard, Robert. "Goya's House Revisited: Why a Deaf Man Painted his Walls Black". Bulletin of Spanish Studies, Volume 82, Issue 5 July 2005. 615 – 639
 Havard, Robert. The Spanish eye: painters and poets of Spain. Tamesis Books, 2007. 
 Heselwood, Julia. Lovers: Portraits by 40 Great Artists. London : Frances Lincoln, 2011. 
 Hughes, Robert. Goya. New York: Alfred A. Knopf, 2004. 
 Junquera, Juan José. The Black Paintings of Goya. London: Scala Publishers, 2008. 
 Licht, Fred. Goya: The Origins of the Modern temper in Art. Universe Books, 1979. 
 Stevenson, Ian. European Cases of the Reincarnation Type. Jefferson, NC: McFarland & Co, 2009.

External links

1820s paintings
Portraits by Francisco Goya